The Ruixing S50 and Ruixing S50V is a 7-seater MPV produced by Changan Automobile under the Ruixing sub-brand.

Overview

The Ruixing S50 debuted in the 2016 and was launched on the Chinese auto market with prices ranging from 48,900 yuan to 77,900 yuan at launch. 

The Ruixing S50 seats seven in a 2-2-3 configuration. The power of the Ruixing S50 comes from a 1.6 liter inline-four producing 116hp and 150nm of torque. The front and rear end design of the Ruixing S50 is controversial as the styling heavily resembles the second generation Toyota Alphard.

The Ruixing S50 is manufactured by Chana, Changan's commercial division, also later known as Oushang. As of 2019, the Ruixing van products has been excluded from Oushang's official website and was sold separately from a different channel. Internationally, the Ruixing S50 was sold simply as the Changan S50.

References

External links
S50 Official website 

Ruixing S50
Compact MPVs
Front-wheel-drive vehicles
Cars of China
Cars introduced in 2016